"Back and Forth" is a song by American hip hop recording artist B.o.B. It was released on August 13, 2015, in promotion of his experimental project, Psycadelik Thoughtz (2015).

Composition 
"Back and Forth" is a funk and disco, up-tempo record with a heavily Auto-Tuned chorus. The song was compared by many critics to works of French electronic music duo Daft Punk and American rapper Snoop Dogg.

Track listing
 Digital single

Release history

References

2015 singles
B.o.B songs
Songs written by B.o.B
Grand Hustle Records singles
2015 songs
Atlantic Records singles